Air Cess was a cargo airline based in Sharjah, United Arab Emirates. It was founded by Russian arms dealer Viktor Bout.

Code data

ICAO Code: ACS (not current)

Fleet

The Air Cess fleet included the following aircraft in August 2006:

1 Antonov An-12
2 Antonov An-24
1 Antonov An-26
1 Antonov An-72

References

Defunct airlines of the United Arab Emirates
Defunct cargo airlines
Cargo airlines of the United Arab Emirates